"Cry Cry" is a song by German singer Oceana. It was released on 13 March 2009.

Compositions
"Cry Cry" was written and produced by Oceana.

Charts

References

 
2009 songs
2009 singles
Aya Nakamura songs
Songs written by Aya Nakamura